Dichloroacetyl chloride is the organic compound with the formula CHCl2COCl.  It is the acyl chloride of dichloroacetic acid. It is a colourless liquid and is used in acylation reactions.

Preparation
Unlike typical acid chlorides, dichloroacetyl chloride is not prepared from the acid. Industrial routes include oxidation of 1,1,2-trichloroethane, hydrolysis of pentachloroethane,  and the carboxylation of chloroform:
CHCl2CH2Cl  +  O2   →   CHCl2COCl  +  H2O
CHCl2CCl3  +  H2O   →   CHCl2COCl  +  2 HCl
CHCl3  +  CO2   →   CHCl2COCl  +  1/2 O2

Uses
Hydrolysis gives dichloroacetic acid. It is one of the precursors to antibiotics, including chloramphenicol.
Another reported use was in the synthesis of WIN 18,446.

References

Acyl chlorides